Kuzminki may refer to:
Kuzminki District, a district of Moscow
Kuzminki (Moscow Metro), a station of the Moscow Metro
Kuzminki (rural locality), name of several rural localities in Russia
Vlakhernskoye-Kuzminki, a former Stroganov and Golitsyn estate in Moscow